The 2022 Otago Regional Council election began with postal voting on 16th Sept 2022 and ended at noon on Sat 8 October 2022. Voting was by first past the post. The Otago Regional Council makes decisions about managing resources in the region, such as air, water, soil and the coastline. It also carries out plant and pest control, helps prepare for natural disasters, and is involved in regional transport, particularly buses. The council is made up of 11 councillors. Councillors are elected to represent constituencies (areas in the region).  The previous election was in 2019 and there was some  controversy in the council.

The first progress results indicated that there would be at least four new councillors but some progress results were close, within 1 vote, however the final count put Michael Laws 21 ahead. Notable new councillors were a candidate representing the Greens (Alan Somerville) and a 21 year old non-binary councillor (Elliot Weir) 
The Council elected Gretchen Robertson (the highest polling candidate with 15 years experience) as the chair (7 to 5) and new councillor Lloyd McCall as deputy (7 to 5). The previous chair (Cr Noone) said he was no longer the best person for the role.

Candidates and Results 
Results of the 2022 Otago Regional Council triennial election:

2019 Election 

Six councillors were elected from the Dunedin Constituency in a first past the post vote. The next highest polling candidate, the Green endorsed candidate (Scott Willis), missed out by about 1500 votes. He was one of four high polling candidates with over 9,000 votes who were not elected.  

Three councillors are standing again in 2019 and at least three new councillors will be elected.

References

Politics of Dunedin
Otago Regional Council 2022
October 2022 events in New Zealand